Kole Hall (born 22 August 1998) is a Bermudan semi-professional footballer who currently plays as a forward for  North club Chester.

Career statistics

Club

Notes

International

International goals
Scores and results list Bermuda's goal tally first.

References

1998 births
Living people
Bermudian footballers
Bermudian expatriate footballers
Bermuda international footballers
Association football forwards
Tranmere Rovers F.C. players
Radcliffe F.C. players
AFC Telford United players
Altrincham F.C. players
Bermudian expatriate sportspeople in England
Expatriate footballers in England
City of Liverpool F.C. players
Northern Premier League players
National League (English football) players